is a 1998 3D fighting arcade game by Capcom that draws heavily from the various subgenres of mecha anime. It was later ported to the Dreamcast console. The player controls a giant robot which is used to fight another robot in one-on-one combat. Studio Nue designed the robots in this game.

Story
The setting of Tech Romancer takes place in a far future of Earth, where advanced technology have made things calm and decent for the citizens of Japan and the rest of the world. However, the peace doesn't last long as an evil alien tyrant named Goldibus invades the planet with its loyal followers and seeks to conquer the world while enslaving the human race with an emotionless iron fist. An unlikely group of heroes band together to fight against the threat of Goldibus with their own unique mecha robots and all of them won't rest until Goldibus is defeated and the world is safe from the imminent danger.

Game modes
The game is primarily played in two modes: Story Mode, and Hero Challenge Mode. The Dreamcast version also had minigames that could be played on the VMU for points.

Story Mode
Each mecha has its own story mode, which plays out like an anime series, with each battle broken up by an episode title, eyecatch, and dialog scenes before and after each battle. Each mecha has its own story (where it is the star of its own show), and decisions made in the dialog scenes, as well as the conditions under which a battle is won, can cause some stories to branch out and have multiple paths and endings. The other mecha and characters naturally make appearances, but their role may vary from their actual origins to fit the "star" mecha's story.

Hero Challenge Mode
An "Arcade-style" mode where the player fights through each of the major mecha and bosses. Various hidden mecha and pilots found in the game can only be used in Hero Challenge Mode. In the Dreamcast version, points earned in Hero Challenge Mode and the VMU minigames could be used to purchase hidden characters including boss characters and movies.

Matching Service
In Japan, the game is re-released as "Choukou Senki Kikaioh For Matching Service" because of its online functionality.

Gameplay
Battles take place mostly on a flat 3D plane, with buildings and other terrain features scattered around. Destroying the terrain (by attacking or walking through them) releases power-ups, which include three weapons (vary between each character/mecha), armor or life powerups, and the Hero Mode powerup, which increases the power of your mecha's attacks, and may also unlock additional abilities or moves.

Rather than rounds, the matches are decided by the life meters of the fighters. Each fighter has two life meters, and is destroyed when the second one is depleted. In addition, each mecha gets an armor gauge that, when broken by consistent brute attacks, lowers the mecha's defense and makes it harder to recover from attacks received.

Each mecha has at least two super attacks, as well as a Final Attack, which is usable when the opponent is down to the last 50% of their second lifebar. This attack, when activated and successfully connected, automatically destroys the opponent, winning the battle.

Reception

in Japan, Game Machine listed the arcade version in their November 15, 1998 issue as the Fourth most-successful arcade game of the week.

GameRankings, which assigns a normalised rating in the Percentages Grade, calculated an average score of 78% for The Dreamcast version. Famicom Tsūshin scored The Dreamcast version of the game a 29 out of 40, one points away from Silver Awards Editors' Choice. Greg Orlando of NextGen said of the game, "It's not often when we get to step into our favorite anime and beat some metal ass. Now if only the fighting were as inspired as the off-the-wall anime plot..." James Mielke of GameSpot described the game as “A Combination of great graphics and solid fighting fun”, He noted the game has contains more replay value than Jojo's Bizarre Adventure, Street Fighter III, and Plasma Sword: Nightmare of Bilstein combined. Anoop Gantayat of IGN described the game as “The Best Single-Player mode ever in a Fighting Game” due to the inclusion of Dialogue tree. BenT of Planet Dreamcast described the game as “a great surprise from Capcom” due to Its Japanese Anime stylings and superb character design, as well as the simple yet addictive gameplay. but criticised the overly simplistic gameplay, and underwhelming graphics compare to other titles released for the Dreamcast around the same time (most notably Resident Evil – Code: Veronica which were also made by Capcom and MDK2, from Bioware).

Notes

References

External links

Official Japanese Site 

1998 video games
3D fighting games
Arcade video games
Capcom games
Dreamcast games
Video games about mecha
Fighting games
Video games developed in Japan
Virgin Interactive games